The 1989 World Sportscar Championship season was the 37th season of FIA World Sportscar Championship motor racing. It featured the 1989 FIA World Sports Prototype Championship, which was open to Group C1 Sports Prototypes, Group C2 Sports Prototypes and IMSA GTP cars. The championship was contested over an eight round series which ran from 9 April to 29 October 1989.

Schedule

Entries

Group C1

Group C2

IMSA GTP

Results and standings

Race results

In order to be classified for points, a team had to complete 90% of the winner's distance.  Further, drivers were required to complete at least 30% of their car's total race distance to qualify for championship points.  Drivers forfeited points if they drove in more than one car during the race.  Group C2 entries earned two extra points for any finish within the overall top ten finishing positions.

Drivers championships
Drivers only scored for their six best results.  Points earned but not tallied toward their total are marked in parenthesis.

World Sports Prototype Championship for Drivers

FIA Cup for C2 Drivers

Teams championships
Teams were only awarded points for their highest finishing entry.

World Sports Prototype Championship for Teams

FIA Cup for C2 Teams

References

Further reading
 Automobile Year 1989/90
 Peter Higham, The Guinness Guide To International Motor Racing, 1995, pages 261-262 & 302-303
 János L. Wimpffen, Time and Two Seats, 1999

External links
 1989 World Sports Prototype Championship race results at wspr-racing.com
 Teams Championship tables – 1985 to 1992 at www.wspr-racing.com
 Championship race results and images at www.racingsportscars.com
 1989 World Sports Prototype Championship race results at www.wsrp.ic.cz

 
World Sportscar Championship seasons
Sports